Ada Kuchařová (born 5 January 1958 in Brno) is a Czech orienteering competitor. She received three silver medals and two bronze medals at the 1983, 1987, 1989 and 1991 World Orienteering Championships.

Kuchařová most recently competed in an event counting towards International Orienteering Federation rankings in September 2001.

World cup
At the Orienteering World Cup Kucharová finished overall 9th in 1986, 11th in 1988, and 11th in 1990.

References

1958 births
Living people
Sportspeople from Brno
Czech orienteers
Czechoslovak orienteers
Female orienteers
Foot orienteers
World Orienteering Championships medalists